Love & Honesty is third Japanese studio album (sixth overall) by South Korean singer BoA, released via Avex Trax on January 15, 2004. The album also came in a "Perfect Edition" which had two discs—the standard CD and a DVD. Love & Honesty experienced commercial success in Japan, where it was number one on the Oricon charts for two weeks. In its first week the album sold 296,781 copies while during its second week it sold 145,325 copies. Love & Honesty was certified Triple Platinum by the RIAJ within a month of its release and was the 13th best-selling album in Japan during 2004.

Track listing

Sampling credits
"Rock With You" contains a sample of Janet Jackson's "You Ain't Right"

Charts and sales

Album charts

Sales and certifications

Singles

References

BoA albums
2004 albums
Avex Group albums